Nirupama Rajendra is a notable Indian classical dancer in the Bharathnatyam and Kathak dance forms. She is based in Bangalore, Karnataka. Nirupama and her husband Rajendra (ನಿರುಪಮ ಮತ್ತು ರಾಜೇಂದ್ರ) perform Kathak together. They established the Abhinava Dance Company in 1994 with an aim to make dance more accessible. They are known for fusing traditional and contemporary dance styles. The dance duo has given many performances and received several awards including Natya Mayuri and Natya Mayura (1998), Karnataka Kalashree (2011) and Nritya Choodamani.

Early life 

Nirupama had a passion for dance from a very young age. She began her formal training in Bharathanatyam at the age of five. She saw dance as a major form of expression and enjoyed sharing it with people. Her passion for the art form of Kathak began under the tutelage of Guru Maya Rao. She learnt both Kathak and Bharatanatyam as a young child.

Personal life 
Nirupama met her spouse as a young adult when both she and Rajendra were students under their Guru Maya Rao. She is an alumna of Mount Carmel College, 
Bangalore. At the age of 25, they got married and started as young dancers, who chose their careers in performing arts. As the couple grew, their journey was that of experimentation, training, and practice. Today they are widely recognized as artists who have given a new and modern twist to Kathak through their dance company Abhinava.

Abhinava Dance company 
“Abhinavas” was established in 1994 with an objective to make traditional Indian dance forms approachable to audiences in India and around the world. The Dance Company blossomed under the passionate influence of the dancing couple Nirupama and Rajendra. The dance company has choreographed various dance recitals that embody both God and Nature.

Deeply ingrained in tradition, the duo has brought a unique presentation style, a fusion of ethnic and contemporary dance and music genres like Jazz, Spanish, Afro, and World Music. The style of merging contemporary with traditional art was inspired by Kumudini Lakhia.  Abhinava Dance Company has revitalized classical dance, keeping in mind the originality of the art form. While incorporating new techniques and styles, the main challenge lies in retaining the actual essence of the story.

Performances 
Nirupama, throughout her career, has choreographed and performed for various events. The company also hosts an annual festival called Madanothsava, which a celebration of life and the season of Spring. Some notable performances are:

 Harshika - 2020
 Festival Parva - 2020 - 3 day - Day 1 - Rama Katha Vismaya (Ramayana), Day 2 - Interdisciplinary Conclave, Day 3 -  Madanothsava (Spring Celebration)
 Kala Dwaraka - 2020 - Online Dance Festival
 Rasaananda(love for Krishna)
 Krishnaa - Fire to Frost - 2019 - based on Draupadi
 OJAS - A rendition of Krishna - 2010

Awards and recognitions 
For her tremendous contributions to the field of Performing Arts, she has received various awards such as:

 Nirupama- Natya Mayuri - (1998)
 Rajendra Sir-  Natya Mayura- (1998)
 Karnataka Kalashree Award for their outstanding contribution in the field of performing arts- (2011)
 Krishna Gana Sabha's prestigious dance title Nritya Choodamani
 In 2013, Nirupama Rajendra were honoured for their contributions at Maha Maya, a dance festival organized as a tribute to dancer US Krishna Rao in Ravindra Kalakshetra in Bangalore.

References

External links 

Artists from Bangalore
Bharatanatyam exponents
Dancers from Karnataka
Entertainer duos
Kathak exponents
Living people
Performers of Indian classical dance
Indian female classical dancers
Women artists from Karnataka
21st-century Indian women artists
21st-century Indian dancers
Year of birth missing (living people)